Boglárlelle was a resort town in Somogy County, Hungary, on the south shore of Lake Balaton. It was created on December 31, 1978 by merging the villages of Balatonboglár and Balatonlelle. On January 1, 1984 it was elevated to "village with town status" (a special status for villages that did not meet the requirement for town status but were appointed to be centers of their districts). On January 1, 1986 it was finally granted town status, and merged with the nearby village Szőlőskislak.

In 1991 Balatonboglár and Balatonlelle became independent again, and both was granted town status. Szőlőskislak remained a part of Balatonboglár.

References

Sources
 History of Boglárlelle (Hungarian)

Former municipalities of Hungary
History of Somogy